Brandon A. Jones (born February 18, 1997) is an American professional stock car racing driver. He competes full-time in the NASCAR Xfinity Series, driving the No. 9 Chevrolet Camaro for JR Motorsports. He has also competed in the NASCAR Camping World Truck Series and NASCAR K&N Pro Series West (now the ARCA Menards Series West) in the past.

He was formerly a development driver for the now defunct Eddie Sharp Racing and Turner Scott Motorsports teams as well as GMS Racing and Richard Childress Racing, and Joe Gibbs Racing.

Racing career

Jones began racing in 2010 at age 13, under the supervision of short track racer Bubba Gale and his son former KHI development driver Cale Gale. Jones would race full-time in 2011 in the pro truck divisions at Lanier Raceplex and Gresham Motorsports Park in Georgia, winning track points championships at both facilities. Jones raced in late models for Eddie Sharp Racing in 2012, competing in the Pro All Stars Series (PASS) and United Auto Racing Association (UARA) series. Jones would make his debut in the NASCAR K&N Pro Series East later that year at Greenville-Pickens Speedway, finishing 14th in the No. 33 Rheem Chevrolet after wrecking on the last lap while running in fifth place. In 2013 at the age of 15, Jones signed a contract to drive for Turner Motorsports (later Turner Scott Motorsports) to run the full UARA season, the PASS Series, six races in the K&N East Series and one in the West series, and selected NASCAR Late Model Stock races. Cale Gale and Mike Greci would serve as crew chiefs for Jones. Jones would also make his national series debut in the Camping World Truck Series for TSM, running the No. 33 truck for the team beginning at Bristol Motor Speedway in August. Jones finished 27th at Bristol, 20th at Iowa, and 19th at Martinsville.

In 2014, Jones would move into the K&N Pro Series East full-time for Turner Scott Motorsports, joining fellow teenager Ben Rhodes. Jones also ran an expanded Truck Series schedule and select ARCA Racing Series events. Jones' efforts would be headed by another former driver Shane Huffman. Jones won his debut ARCA race at Winchester Speedway, scored a second win at Indianapolis Raceway Park and finished third at Madison International Speedway. He would score his first K&N Pro Series win at Iowa Speedway in August, holding off former teammate Kenzie Ruston and Cole Custer. After 14 of 16 races in the K&N East Series and three Truck Series races, which included a fourth-place finish at Dover, Jones would part ways with TSM due to internal issues in the organization, joining Richard Childress Racing for the remaining K&N races. Jones would run the 33 truck for GMS Racing in two additional races, sponsored by Rheem brand Russell. He would finish 4th in the K&N Pro Series East standings.

For 2015, RCR signed Jones to a part-time schedule in the NASCAR Xfinity Series, sharing the No. 33 Chevrolet Camaro with Childress' grandson Austin Dillon and Paul Menard.  When Jones raced in his final Xfinity race in 2015, he scored his first top 5 and his career-best finish as a 5th place outing.  Jones also ran a part-time schedule in the ARCA Racing Series, sharing the No. 25 Menards Toyota Camry for Venturini Motorsports with ARCA legend Frank Kimmel. In January, it was announced that Jones would return to GMS Racing for 16 Truck Series races in 2015. Jones also ran select K&N Pro Series East races for NTS Motorsports. On September 24, RCR announced that Jones would begin competing full-time in the Xfinity Series in 2016. Jones also joined Ranier Racing to compete part-time in the Truck Series, driving the No. 71. Jones started the season with a 7th-place finish after being involved in the first crash at Daytona.  Then at Talladega, Jones had his breakout race, leading the most laps, 31 total, then finishing 18th.

To start 2017, Jones won his first career Xfinity Series pole at Daytona with a speed of 184.472 mph. In the race, Jones would run in the top 10 up until lap 29 when he was hit in the right rear by Justin Allgaier. This caused Jones to turn hard right into the SAFER Barrier nearly head-on at 185 mph. He walked away from the crash unharmed. In an interview following, Jones called the crash "The hardest hit I've ever had." Jones later have a dismal 2017 season with 8 DNF's and not making it into the Playoffs. There is speculation as to whether the No. 33 was an R&D setup car.

On November 15, 2017, it was announced that Jones would replace Matt Tifft at Joe Gibbs Racing in 2018. Tifft signed with RCR, making it a de facto driver swap. After 17 top 10s, two top fives, and his second career pole at Dover in May, he finished 9th in final points after being eliminated in the Round of 12 in the playoffs.

In 2019, Jones once again made it to the playoffs but was eliminated in the Round of 12. Despite being eliminated, he scored his first win at Kansas.

Jones began the 2020 NASCAR Xfinity Series season with two straight top-ten finishes. After winning the pole in the third race at Auto Club Speedway, he scored his second career Xfinity win the following week at Phoenix Raceway after passing Kyle Busch with 20 laps remaining.

On October 13, 2020, Jones was confirmed for another season with JGR's Xfinity team.

On April 8, 2022, Jones won at Martinsville with a last lap pass over the night's most dominant driver Ty Gibbs, earning his first win since 2020, his first win of the 2022 season, and the fifth win of his Xfinity Series career. At the Martinsville playoff race, Jones took the lead on the final overtime lap when Gibbs dumped him from behind for the win, resulting in a 23rd place finish and an elimination in the Round of 8.

On May 25, 2022, it was announced that Jones would return to the ARCA Menards Series to run five races (Charlotte, Iowa, Pocono, Watkins Glen and Bristol) in the No. 81 car for Joe Gibbs Racing. The races at Iowa and Bristol are also combination races with the ARCA Menards Series East, which was previously the K&N Pro Series East, marking Jones' first starts in that series since 2019. Although JGR sold their ARCA team to Kyle Busch Motorsports before the start of the 2022 season, this entry will be a JGR car and not a KBM car.

On September 14, 2022, it was announced that Jones would return to a Chevrolet-based team, JR Motorsports, in 2023, replacing Noah Gragson, who moved to Legacy Motor Club' No. 42 car full-time.

Personal life
Brandon Jones is the son of JR Jones, President and CEO of Rheem Comfort Products, which has sponsored Jones, Kevin Harvick, Turner Scott Motorsports, Richard Childress Racing, Joe Gibbs Racing, and several other teams through their Rheem, RUUD, Richmond, and Russel/HTPG brands.

Jones graduated from Lake Norman High School in Mooresville, North Carolina.

Motorsports career results

NASCAR
(key) (Bold – Pole position awarded by qualifying time. Italics – Pole position earned by points standings or practice time. * – Most laps led.)

Xfinity Series

Gander RV & Outdoors Truck Series

 Season still in progress
 Ineligible for series points

K&N Pro Series West

ARCA Menards Series
(key) (Bold – Pole position awarded by qualifying time. Italics – Pole position earned by points standings or practice time. * – Most laps led.)

ARCA Menards Series East

References

External links
 
 Official profile at JR Motorsports
 

Living people
1997 births
Racing drivers from Atlanta
ARCA Menards Series drivers
NASCAR drivers
Joe Gibbs Racing drivers
JR Motorsports drivers
Kyle Busch Motorsports drivers
KCMG drivers
Richard Childress Racing drivers